La Thieuloye is a commune in the Pas-de-Calais department in the Hauts-de-France region of France.

Geography

Population

Places of interest
 The church of Notre-Dame, dating from the nineteenth century.
 Old houses and drinking-fountains.

Notable people
Robert-François Damiens (1715–1757), who attained notoriety with his attempted assassination of Louis XV of France and subsequent gruesome execution in 1757, was born in the village.

See also
Communes of the Pas-de-Calais department

References

Thieuloye